Gangnauli is a village in Saharanpur district in the Indian state of Uttar Pradesh.

References

Villages in Saharanpur district